The men's 1500 metre freestyle event at the 11th FINA World Swimming Championships (25m) took place 16 December 2012 at the Sinan Erdem Dome.  This event was a timed-final where each swimmer swam just once. The top 8 seeded swimmers swam in the evening, and the remaining swimmers swam in the morning session.

In June 2013, Danish swimmer Mads Glæsner was stripped of the gold medal after testing positive for levomethamphetamine following the 400 m freestyle final.

However, upon appeal to the Court of Arbitration for Sport, Glaesner's gold medal was reinstated as a separate test after the race did not contain the prohibited substance,.

Records
Prior to this competition, the existing world and championship records were as follows.

No new records were set during this competition.

Results

References

External links
 2012 FINA World Swimming Championships (25 m): Men's 1500 metre freestyle (final rankings), from OmegaTiming.com.

Freestyle 1500 metre, men's
World Short Course Swimming Championships